Brihaspa is a genus of moths of the family Crambidae.

Species
Brihaspa abacodes Meyrick, 1933
Brihaspa atrostigmella Moore, 1867
Brihaspa autocratica Meyrick, 1933
Brihaspa chrysostomus Zeller, 1852
Brihaspa frontalis (Walker, 1866)
Brihaspa nigropunctella Pagenstecher, 1893

References

Schoenobiinae
Crambidae genera
Taxa named by Frederic Moore